Achira may refer to:

 Canna indica, also called achira and Canna edulis
 Achyra, a village in western Greece
 Achira, an antagonist from the animated series Extreme Ghostbusters